Vladimir Zelenbaba (born February 6, 1982) is a Serbian footballer who plays with Scarborough SC in the Canadian Soccer League.

Career

Serbia 
Zelenbaba began his career in the Second League of FR Yugoslavia with FK Železničar Beograd. In 2003, he moved to league rivals FK Hajduk Beograd where the club won their division which secured promotion to the First League of Serbia and Montenegro. Following his stint with Hajduk, he signed with FK Radnički Pirot for the 2006 season. He would further resume his career in the second tier by signing with FK Inđija.

Ukraine  
In 2007, he went abroad to play with Zorya Luhansk in the 2006–07 Ukrainian Premier League. He made his debut for the club on March 11, 2007, against Karpaty Lviv. Throughout his debut season in Luhansk, he appeared in six matches. In the winter of 2007, he was placed on the transfer list. Before he departed from the club, he made an appearance in the 2007–08 Ukrainian Cup.

Central Asia 
After his brief stint in Ukraine, to went to Kazakhstan to play with FC Kaisar in the Kazakhstan Premier League. He remained in the first division the following season by signing with rivals FC Ordabasy. Following his two-year stint in Central Asia, he returned to the Serbian second division to sign with FK Zemun in 2010. He would appear in 3 matches with Zemun. In 2011, he went to the southern Caucasus region to play with Kapaz PFK in the Azerbaijan Premier League. In total, he played in 10 matches and departed from the club after one season.

Waterloo 
In 2012, he went overseas to North America to sign with SC Waterloo Region in the Canadian Soccer League. He re-signed with Waterloo for the 2013 season. He managed to reach the CSL Championship final with Waterloo where they defeated Kingston FC with Zelenbaba contributing two goals. 

After the conclusion of the CSL season, he played the winter months in Europe with NK Travnik of the Premier League of Bosnia and Herzegovina. Throughout his stint with Travnik, he featured in 3 matches. He departed from Travnik after a single season to return to Waterloo. In 2015, he made his second championship final appearance where Waterloo was defeated by Toronto Croatia.   

Following a short absence from Waterloo, he returned for the 2017 season. He re-signed with Waterloo for the 2018 season and featured in the opening round of the playoffs where he recorded a goal against the Serbian White Eagles which advanced the club to the next round. The club was eliminated in the second round to FC Vorkuta. The 2019 season marked his final year with the club where he helped the team secure a postseason berth by finishing third in the First Division.

Asia 
For the 2016 season, Waterloo was temporarily relegated to the second division and as a result, Zelenbaba returned to Asia to play with Bangkok F.C. of the Thai Division 1 League. After a brief stint in Thailand, he returned to Serbia to join OFK Balkan Mirijevo.

Scarborough 
In 2020, he signed with Scarborough SC. In his debut season with Scarborough, he assisted in securing the First Division title, and featured in the championship final against FC Vorkuta, but were defeated by a score of 2-1. He featured in the ProSound Cup final in 2021 against FC Vorkuta but was defeated in a penalty shootout. He won his second championship title by assisting Scarborough in defeating Vorkuta in the 2021 playoffs. 

Zelenbaba re-signed with the eastern Toronto side for this third season. He helped the club secure a postseason by finishing third throughout the regular season. In the opening round of the playoffs, he contributed a goal against BGH City FC which helped advance the club to the next round. He played in Scarborough's run to the championship final, which the eastern Toronto side lost to FC Continentals (formerly FC Vorkuta).

Managerial career 
In 2016, he was the head coach for the FK Voždovac U-13 team. He was a player-coach in 2017 for SC Waterloo Region and became associated with ProStars FC as an academy coach.

Honors 
SC Waterloo Region
 CSL Championship: 2013 

Scarborough SC 

 CSL Championship: 2021

 Canadian Soccer League First Division: 2020

References

External links
 

1982 births
Living people
Sportspeople from Knin
Serbs of Croatia
Serbian footballers
Association football midfielders
Canadian Soccer League (1998–present) players
FK Hajduk Beograd players
FK Radnički Pirot players
FK Inđija players
FK Zemun players
FC Zorya Luhansk players
Expatriate footballers in Ukraine
FC Kaisar players
FC Ordabasy players
Expatriate footballers in Kazakhstan
Kapaz PFK players
Expatriate footballers in Azerbaijan
SC Waterloo Region players
Expatriate soccer players in Canada
Expatriate footballers in Thailand
Vladimir Zelenbaba
Ukrainian Premier League players
NK Travnik players
Scarborough SC players
Serbian First League players
Vladimir Zelenbaba
Kazakhstan Premier League players
Azerbaijan Premier League players
Premier League of Bosnia and Herzegovina players
Second League of Serbia and Montenegro players